St Mary's Church, Battersea, is the oldest of the churches in Battersea in the London Borough of Wandsworth, in the inner south-west of the UK's capital city. Its parish shared by three Anglican churches is in the diocese of Southwark. Christians have worshipped at the site continuously since around 800 AD. It is a Grade I listed building for its combined heritage and architectural merit.

History
St. Mary's is among the earliest five documented Christian holy sites south of the River Thames in London, historically in Surrey, in the Diocese of Winchester. The original church was built around 800 AD, and the present building was completed in 1777. It was designed by Joseph Dixon, a local architect.

The church is built of brick, with stone used for quoins and other dressings. It consists of a nave, rectangular in plan, an apse at the east end forming the sanctuary, and a west tower.  The west front has a single storey entrance porch with Tuscan columns supporting a pediment.  The  tower, rising immediately behind it, is topped with a clock chamber and a small spire. Inside, the whole width of the church is spanned by a flat ceiling, and there are wooden galleries supported by columns on three sides. The nave windows are in two tiers, the upper ones round-headed.

The modern triptych in the side chapel is by John Napper (1946). It shows the Annunciation with Battersea Park and the Power Station in the background. To the right Christ walks on the Thames and to the left Lazarus rises beneath the church porch.

The organ is by Saxon Aldred (1993), with a carving of a ram in recognition of the Ram Brewery.

In the sanctuary the east window dates from 1379, the painted window glass dates from 1631 with portraits of Henry VII, Margaret Beaufort, and Queen Elizabeth I. The Dove and Lamb windows, originally from 1796,  by James Pearson, were restored in 1946 after being damaged by a V1 in 1944.

At the back is the terracotta War Memorial by Freda Skinner, depicting the Gate of Life guarded by the Angel of Sacrifice. 

The glass doors to the Vestry were added in 2008 and were engraved by Sally Scott FGE. 

The church has strong connections with art and literature through the artist and poet William Blake, who  married Catherine Boucher there on 17 August 1782, and  J. M. W. Turner, who painted the river from the vestry window.

Windows 
There are four new windows by John Hayward added between 1976 and 1982.

The Blake Window. It includes the figure of Albion at the bottom of the window. In the centre is 'Emanation', a winged image of a figure. The portrait of Blake is from his portrait by Thomas Phillips. The figures either side represent Innocence and Experience. At the bottom left is Blake's signature from the marriage register, together with two drawings by Blake and his wife Catherine.

The Turner Window. Turner lived in Chelsea and visited Battersea to paint in the vestry window. The window was given by The Morgan Crucible Company Ltd to commemorate their long association with the Parish of Battersea.

The Curtis Window. William Curtis, the botanist and founder of the Linnean Society, is buried in the churchyard.  The frame of the portrait is from 'Flora Londinensis': Geranium, wild daffodil, snowdrop, cuckoo pint, grasses, vetch, blackberry, bryony, bindweed, primrose, daisy, dandelion, wild rose, angelica, lovage, mistletoe, buttercup. The epitaph is from the now lost headstone. There is the emblem of the RHS, the arms of the Society of Apothecaries and the arms of the Linnean Society. The map shows the locations of his gardens (Bermondsey, Charlton, Lambeth Marsh and Brompton) and the Chelsea Physic Garden.

The Arnold Window. Below the portrait of Benedict Arnold are the arms of George Washington, with the modern 'Star 'n' Stripes', an earlier flag with 13 States, Union flag of 1777, and the 'Union Jack'. After fighting with George Washington in the American War of Independence he changed side to become an officer in the British Army.

Monuments 
The church includes several important monuments from the earlier church.

Two busts for Baron Oliver Nicholas St John of Lydeard (Viscount Grandison), (d.1630), Lord High Treasurer and Lord Deputy of Ireland, and his wife, Joan Roydon. The sculptor was Nicholas Stone the Elder (1586/7-1647).

Sir Edward Wynter (d.1685). The monument has a bust at the top. The lower panel shows him fighting a tiger and Moors. The epitaph describes his adventures.

Sir John Fleet, Knight, (d.1712). He was Lord Mayor in 1695.

James Bull, Merchant, aged 44 years, (d. 1713), son-in-law of Sir John Fleet.

Henry St John, (d.1751), Viscount Bolingbroke, Secretary of War and Secretary of State under Queen Anne, and Mary Clara des Champs de Marcilly, Marchioness of Villette and Viscountess Bolingroke, (d.1750). There are cameo portraits of them, facing each other, either side of the shield. The epitaphs are by Bolingbroke. The sculptor is Louis-François Roubiliac, signed at the base.

John Camden, (d. 1780), and his eldest daughter Elizabeth Neild, (d. 1791). Girl by a funeral urn with a poetic eulogy. Signed by Coade of Lambeth (1792). 

Richard Rothwell, (d.1821), and his wife Eleanor, (d.1834). By J. G. Bubb.

Notable interments 
 Benedict Arnold and his family are buried in the crypt.
 William Curtis is buried in the churchyard
 John Inglis (bishop)
 Sir Rupert George
 Nathaniel Middleton (1750–1807), a civil servant of the British East India Company.

Gallery

References

External links 

St Mary's Church website

9th-century establishments in England
9th-century church buildings in England
Churches completed in 1777
18th-century Church of England church buildings
Grade I listed churches in London
Church of England church buildings in the London Borough of Wandsworth
Anglican Diocese of Southwark
William Blake
Rebuilt churches in the United Kingdom
Churches on the Thames
Buildings and structures in Battersea
Churches completed in 800